Ilya Viktorovich Abayev (born 2 August 1981) is a Russian former professional football goalkeeper.

Club career
He made his debut in the Russian Football Premier League in 2004 for FC Torpedo Moscow.

Career statistics

Notes

Honours
Lokomotiv Moscow
Russian Cup: 2014–15, 2016-17

External links

 
 

1981 births
Footballers from Moscow
Living people
Russian footballers
Russia national football B team footballers
Association football goalkeepers
FC Torpedo-2 players
FC Torpedo Moscow players
FC Anzhi Makhachkala players
FC Volga Nizhny Novgorod players
FC Lokomotiv Moscow players
FC Krasnodar players
FC Rostov players
FC Chertanovo Moscow players
Russian Premier League players
Russian First League players
Russian Second League players
FC Olimp-Dolgoprudny players